The James H. Ellery Memorial Awards are presented annually to the individuals of the news media for outstanding media coverage of the American Hockey League. The awards are given in memory James Ellery, former publicity director for the AHL. The first award was handed out to one individual in 1965. From 1976 to 2013, three awards were given, one to each for newspaper, radio and television. In 2014, the AHL began awarding only one award for general media coverage.

Winners (2014–present)

Winners (1976–2013)

Newspaper

Radio

Television

Early winners (1965–1975)

References

External links
Official AHL website
AHL Hall of Fame
AHL announces Ellery Award winners

American Hockey League trophies and awards